KELN (97.1 FM) is a Top 40 (CHR) radio station licensed to North Platte, Nebraska, United States. This station serves the North Platte area.  The station is currently owned by Eagle Communications, Inc. and features locally originated programming.

References

External links

ELN
Contemporary hit radio stations in the United States